Nephelaphyllum is a genus with 12 species of orchids (family Orchidaceae). Its genus is distributed in southern China, the Himalayas, Indochina, Indonesia, Malaysia and the Philippines.

Species accepted as of June 2014:

 Nephelaphyllum aureum  J.J.Wood in C.L.Chan. & al. - Borneo
 Nephelaphyllum beccarii Schltr. - Sarawak
 Nephelaphyllum cordifolium (Lindl.) Blume - Sikkim, India, Bhutan, Bangladesh
 Nephelaphyllum flabellatum  Ames & C.Schweinf. in O.Ames - Sabah
 Nephelaphyllum gracile Schltr.  - Borneo
 Nephelaphyllum laciniatum J.J.Sm. - Sulawesi
 Nephelaphyllum mindorense Ames - Philippines
 Nephelaphyllum pulchrum Blume - Hainan, Indochina, Assam, Bhutan, West Bengal, Sikkim, Andaman Islands, Borneo, Java, Sumatra, Philippines 
 Nephelaphyllum tenuiflorum  Blume - Hainan, Hong Kong, Indonesia, Malaysia, Thailand, Vietnam
 Nephelaphyllum trapoides J.J.Sm. - Borneo
 Nephelaphyllum verruculosum Carr -Sabah

References

External links 

 
Collabieae genera
Orchids of Asia